Godfrey Surman (18 July 1914 – 29 May 1987) was an English cricketer. He played for Gloucestershire between 1936 and 1937.

References

External links

1914 births
1987 deaths
English cricketers
Gloucestershire cricketers
People from the Borough of Tewkesbury
Sportspeople from Gloucestershire